The calling party (in some contexts called the "A-Number") is a person who (or device that) initiates a telephone call. The person who, or device that, receives a telephone call is the called party (or callee or B-party).

In some countries, it is common etiquette for a call originator to identify himself first instead of the receiver, when the connection is established.  

Modems and fax machines use different tones when originating or answering a connection, which may be a source of problems for the user.

Telephony
Teletraffic